Leñadores de Las Tunas (English: Las Tunas Lumberjacks) is a baseball team in the Cuban National Series. Based in the city of Las Tunas, the Leñadores, or Magos (also known as the Espinosos), were long a perennial last-place team in Group C. Led by Osmani Urrutia in the early 1990s, the Magos were competitive, finishing with winning records in 2004–05 and 2005–06. Shortstop Alex Guerrero, hit a .303/.385/.526 slash line with 103 home runs and 413 RBI in 559 games from 2004-05 through 2011-12.

The teams plays at the Julio Antonio Mella Stadium, inaugurated in 1945 and with a capacity 13,000 spectators.

Las Tunas won the championship for the first time in 2019, defeating Villa Clara 4 games to 1.

Roster

2019 Caribbean Series roster

Notable players
 Yordan Álvarez—2019 American League Rookie of the Year
 Danel Castro 
 Pablo Alberto Civil
 Juan Carlos Luna
 Alex Guerrero
 Félix Núñez 
 Joan Carlos Pedroso
 Gilberto Rodríguez
 Ermidelio Urrutia 
 Henry Urrutia
 Osmani Urrutia—2003-04 Cuban National Series Most Valauble Player (MVP)

Sources

Baseball teams in Cuba
Las Tunas (city)